Oliver Edward Nelson in London with Oily Rags is an album by Oliver Nelson featuring performances recorded in London in 1974 for the Flying Dutchman label.

Reception

The Allmusic site awarded the album 1½ stars stating "Nelson plays well and there are some good moments (particularly on Jobim's "Meditation") but most of the backup musicians sound quite anonymous and little of significance occurs".

Track listing
 "Lucille" (Little Richard, Albert Collins) - 6:13  
 "Woggles" (Chas Hodges, Dave Peacock) - 1:56
 "Cairo to Benghazi" (Joe Jammer) - 10:06
 "Working Man" (Chas Hodges, Dave Peacock) - 3:49
 "Meditation" (Antônio Carlos Jobim, Newton Mendonça) - 6:00 
 "Mailman Bring Me No More Blues" (Bob Katz, Ruth Ann Roberts, Bob Thiele) - 4:42 
 "Hillbilly" (Chas Hodges, Dave Peacock) - 3:42

Personnel
Oliver Nelson - alto saxophone, soprano saxophone
Jimmy Maxwell, Jimmy Owens, Ernie Royal - trumpet (tracks 2 & 7)
Mike Moran - piano
Hugh Burns (tracks 1 & 4-7), Joe Jammer (tracks 1, 3, 6 & 7) - electric guitar
Chas Hodges (tracks 1, 2, 4, 6 & 7), Dave Peacock (tracks 1, 2 & 7) - guitar
Pat Donaldson - electric bass
Pete Gavin - drums
Chris Karan, Frank Ricotti - percussion (tracks 4 & 5)

References

1974 albums
Albums produced by Bob Thiele
Flying Dutchman Records albums
Oliver Nelson albums